Aurelio Menegazzi (15 November 1900 – 23 November 1979), also known as Aléardo Menegazzi, was an Italian racing cyclist and Olympic champion in track cycling. He won a gold medal in the team pursuit at the 1924 Summer Olympics in Paris.

References

External links
 
 
 
 

1900 births
1979 deaths
Italian male cyclists
Italian track cyclists
Olympic cyclists of Italy
Olympic gold medalists for Italy
Olympic medalists in cycling
Cyclists at the 1924 Summer Olympics
Medalists at the 1924 Summer Olympics
Cyclists from the Province of Verona